Julian Ahmataj (born 24 May 1979 in Elbasan) is a former Albanian football player and current head coach. He usually played on the left side of the defence or the midfield but could also play in the centre as both a defender and a midfielder.

Flamurtari
He was released by the Flamurtari chairman Shpëtim Gjika on 19 July 2011, along with three other main players, Daniel Xhafaj, Sebino Plaku and Bledar Devolli.

National team statistics

References

External links

1979 births
Living people
Footballers from Elbasan
Albanian footballers
Albanian men's footballers
Association football defenders
Association football midfielders
Albania international footballers
KF Elbasani players
KF Bylis Ballsh players
FK Dinamo Tirana players
KF Teuta Durrës players
FK Partizani Tirana players
KF Tirana players
Flamurtari Vlorë players
Albanian football managers
KF Teuta Durrës managers
KF Bylis Ballsh managers
Besa Kavajë managers
KF Korabi Peshkopi managers
KS Burreli managers
FC Kamza managers
KF Tirana managers
KF Skënderbeu Korçë managers